The blotcheye soldierfish (Myripristis berndti) is a species of soldierfish belonging to the family Holocentridae.

Description

This species grows to a length of  TL. The body is oval and laterally compressed and the scales are quite large. The basic colour is silvery pink to pale yellowish, with red scale margins. The opercular membrane is black. The dorsal fin is large and spiny, ranging from yellow to orange-yellow. The other fins are red with white edges. The eyes are large, as this fish is mainly nocturnal. The lower jaw protrudes beyond the upper jaw when mouth is closed. They usually aggregate in mixed-species and mainly feed on plankton. This fish is a target of commercial fisheries and can also be found in the aquarium trade.

Distribution and habitat
Myripristis berndti is widespread in the Indian and Pacific Oceans.

References

External links
Australian Museum
 

Myripristis
Fish described in 1903
Taxa named by David Starr Jordan